Lisbeth Castro (born 28 April 1988) is a Venezuelan footballer who plays as goalkeeper for Spanish Segunda División Pro club Zaragoza CFF and the Venezuela women's national team.

References

External links
Lisbeth Castro at BDFútbol

1988 births
Living people
People from Guárico
Venezuelan women's footballers
Women's association football goalkeepers
Zaragoza CFF players
Segunda Federación (women) players
Venezuela women's international footballers
Venezuelan expatriate women's footballers
Venezuelan expatriate sportspeople in Colombia
Expatriate women's footballers in Colombia
Venezuelan expatriate sportspeople in Brazil
Expatriate women's footballers in Brazil
Venezuelan expatriate sportspeople in Spain
Expatriate women's footballers in Spain